Canopy soils, also known as arboreal soils, exist in areas of the forest canopy where branches, crevices, or some other physical feature on a tree can accumulate organic matter, such as leaves or fine branches. Eventually, this organic matter weathers into some semblance of a soil, and can reach depths of 30 cm in some temperate rainforests. 
Epiphytes can take root in this thin soil, which accelerates the development of the soil by adding organic material and physically breaking up material with their root system. Common epiphytes in the canopy soils in temperate rainforests include mosses, ferns, and lichens. Epiphytes on trees in the temperate zone are often ubiquitous and can cover entire trees. Some host trees house up to 6.5 tons dry weight of epiphytic biomass, which can equate to more than 4x of its own foliar mass. This massive presence means their dynamics need to be better understood in order to fully understand forest dynamics.  The nutrients that become stored within canopy soils can then be utilized by the epiphytes that grow in them, and even the tree that the canopy soil is accumulating in through the growth of canopy roots. This storage allows nutrients to be more closely cycled through an ecosystem, and prevents nutrients from being washed out of the system.

Development
Numerous factors are involved in evaluating the characteristics of a developing canopy soil. The types of plant material that accumulate on canopy soils can strongly influence the conditions that develop, including pH, moisture content, nutrient content, and nutrient availability for the soil. The age of the canopy is also important to its development. Older canopies can accumulate more material and create a deeper soil. Within the soil, the organic material will further decompose in an older canopy soil, and will have less fibrous material than a younger canopy soil. Perhaps more intuitively, the height at which organic material begins to accumulate can also significantly impact the development of canopy soils. Canopy soils higher in a forest's canopy will be more exposed to the elements, resulting in a higher exposure to sunlight and wind, which could result in extreme shifts in available soil moisture.

Most epiphytes have very shallow root systems, mainly used to attach them to their host tree. Thus moisture-dependent epiphytes in shallow root systems are more sensitive to changes in moisture content, and at risk of desiccation. In contrast, canopy soils that form lower in the canopy are more likely to be sheltered from more extreme swings in light exposure and moisture content. Additionally, lower canopy soils also have a greater chance of accumulating organic matter that falls from higher neighboring trees, or from the higher regions of the tree housing the canopy soil. This allows these lower canopy soils to accumulate more organic matter and nutrients, which allows them to be more productive.
 
The organisms that inhabit a soil significantly influence the development and the turnover time of nutrients, and the same is true for canopy soils. Macro-organisms such as mites and maggots can consume organic material and break it down in their digestive tracts, aiding in the mixing and formation of soil. Microorganisms such as bacteria and fungi essentially serve the same purpose, but use different degradation pathways. The presence of these organisms is critical in maintaining the nutrient cycles within the soil, and make available the necessary nutrients for the growth of epiphytes and the micro-ecosystem.  
The microorganism community found in canopy soils has been found to be distinct, but similar to the communities found in the soil of the forest floor. Generally, bacterial communities from fallen epiphytic material are quickly replaced by forest floor bacterial communities, although not completely. Also, when limbs of a host tree containing canopy soils have been severed from the host, a shift in the bacterial community within the soil can be measured. This indicates that the communities contained in the canopy have some reliance on the host tree.

Classification
Canopy soils are classified as histosols, which are composed primarily of organic material. Although they vary in depth, canopy soils commonly have a hemic layer at the very top, consisting mostly of undecomposed sphagnum moss. Their nature and history makes the soils somewhat simple, and nearly always lacking in any kind of mineral component.

Distribution and evolution
Vascular epiphytes represent in total about 9% of all vascular plants in the world, but are much more common in tropical areas. This under-representation of vascular epiphyte diversity is still being disputed, but likely pertains to a few abiotic factors including cooler temperatures, moisture availability, and glacial history. The distributions of epiphytes when pertaining to the Northern and Southern hemispheres is extremely asymmetric. The temperate zones in the southern hemisphere have a much greater abundance of vascular epiphytes than in the northern hemisphere, and they persist further into more polar latitudes. This suggests that abiotic factors such as temperature are far less influential than the glacial history of the region. During the Last Glacial Maximum, about 27,000 years ago, much of the area now occupied by temperate rainforests in the northern hemisphere was covered by extensive ice sheets that removed all life. In contrast, temperate rainforests in the southern hemisphere remained largely ice-free. This strongly favoured ecosystems in the southern hemisphere, and allowed many more species of obligate, vascular epiphytes to evolve and occupy a particular niche. The intimate relationship that vascular epiphytes have with the formation of canopy soils means that the distributions of canopy soils follow a parallel distribution pattern, as it is the pattern of growth and decay of epiphytic growth that promotes the formation of canopy soils.

The presence of certain types of epiphytes could be considered ecosystem engineers, as they can form new canopy soils within an upper story in forest. For example, Fascicularia bicolor is a species of epiphyte in South American temperate rainforests, and belongs to a group known as trash basket epiphytes. These form extensive mats that capture falling organic matter and accumulate it, promoting the formation of canopy soils. These mats regulate the temperature and humidity of the surrounding canopy, and alter the species diversity of epiphytic growth, which should classify them as an ecosystem engineer.

References 

Epiphytes
Forestry
Rainforests
Soil